Dell Horoscope was a periodic American magazine published by Penny Publications covering modern astrology, calling itself "the world's leading astrology magazine". It was in circulation between 1935 and 2020.

History
The magazine was first published in November 1935 with the title Your Daily Horoscope: The Monthly Magazine of Personal Astrology. Its title changed several times during its existence. The magazine was published in New York City from its start in 1935 to 1985.

The publication received attention outside of the astrology community in recent years because of a 1979 article by Richard Nolle defining the concept of a supermoon.

According to its most recent statement of ownership published in the January 2018 issue, paid circulation of the magazine was 22,407 per issue.

Subscriptions were offered in print and digital formats.  Print versions were found on newsstands or often in supermarket checkouts. In addition to the monthly periodical, annual yearbooks are published as well.

Dell Horoscope ended publication with the March/April 2020 issue.

References

External links
 

1935 establishments in the United States
2020 disestablishments in the United States
Monthly magazines published in the United States
Magazines on astrology
Defunct magazines published in the United States
Magazines established in 1935
Magazines disestablished in 2020
Magazines published in Connecticut
Magazines published in New York City